Esther Hui-ping Chang is an American medical scientist, Professor of Georgetown University, founding scientist and senior consultant for SynerGene Therapeutics, Inc.

Biography
Esther Chang received her bachelor's degree from Department of Biology of Fu Jen Catholic University in Taiwan and Ph.D. from Southern Illinois University. She has served in the National Institutes of Health, the National Cancer Institute (NCI), the Uniform University of Health Sciences and the Stanford University Medical Center.

Chang joined Georgetown Lombard Comprehensive Cancer Center in 1996 as a professor of oncology and otolaryngology.

Contributions
Esther Chang's innovative target delivery nano-cancer treatment method minimizes the toxicity of therapeutic agents to normal cells. In other words, in the process of cancer treatment, nanotherapy not only caused no serious side effects, but also produced excellent curative effects. The new treatment passed the first phase of clinical trials in the United States in 2014 and was approved by the US Food and Drug Administration (FDA) to enter the second phase of human clinical trials.

Recognition
1999 - Outstanding  Alumni Award of Fu Jen Catholic University
2014 - American Society for Nanomedicine Lifetime Achievement Award

References

External links
Esther Chang: Georgetown University
Esther H. CHANG | Georgetown University, Washington, D.C. | GU

American scientists
Fu Jen Catholic University alumni
Southern Illinois University alumni
Columbia University alumni
Stanford University faculty
Georgetown University Medical Center faculty
Year of birth missing (living people)
Living people